Maria Antoinette "Mies" Bouwman (31 December 1929 – 26 February 2018) was a Dutch television presenter.

Career
Born in Amsterdam, she started her career on the very first broadcasting evening of the Dutch broadcasting association KRO (Catholic Radio Broadcaster) on 16 October 1951.

Bouwman made her name as the host of the first large fund-raising programme on Dutch TV, Open Het Dorp. In this show viewers were asked to donate money for charity, in order to open a special village for people with a handicap. This show was broadcast live on 26 and 27 November 1962 and lasted 23 hours. Bouwman presented the entire show. Bouwman developed and hosted , known in the UK as The Generation Game. She stopped her regular work after falling sick, but has occasionally returned for special programs.

Bouwman definitively ended her career in 1993 due to health restrictions, and was invested as a Knight of the Order of Orange-Nassau. She later appeared on TV for interviews, but never as host, only as a guest.

Death
Bouwman died on 26 February 2018 in Elst, Netherlands at the age of 88.

See also
Netherlands Public Broadcasting

Sources and references

1929 births
2018 deaths
Mass media people from Amsterdam
Dutch television presenters
Dutch women television presenters
Dutch television talk show hosts
Knights of the Order of Orange-Nassau
20th-century Dutch women